Vasiljevići is a village in the municipality of Ivanjica, Serbia. According to the 2002 census, the village had a population of 64 people.

References

Populated places in Moravica District